"The Boys of Fall" is a song written by Casey Beathard and Dave Turnbull, and recorded by American country music artist Kenny Chesney. It was released in July 2010 as the first single from Chesney's album Hemingway's Whiskey.

Content
The lyrics are about playing high school football. Chesney says the song "is a perfect description of how I grew up and where I grew up."

Critical reception
Matt Bjorke of Roughstock gave the song a four-out-of-five stars review, saying that if the song "is an indication as to where Hemingway's Whiskey is going," he predicts that Chesney has a "monster of an upcoming album."

Music video
The music video debuted on August 2, 2010 on ESPN's SportsCenter. It features many famous football players and coaches talking about their experiences playing high school football and advice they would give to kids, as well as clips of famous players and coaches from the college and professional ranks, past and present including Chesney's longtime friend Sean Payton. Directed by Shaun Silva, the video is over eight minutes in length.

Much of this video was shot in and around Celina, Texas, specifically at Celina High School's football stadium (Celina High is one of the state's dominant football teams, having won or co-won eight state titles). Other scenes were filmed at North Central College in Naperville, Illinois, at the Battle Ground Academy in Franklin, Tennessee, Montgomery Bell Academy in Nashville, Tennessee, and at Gibbs High School in Tennessee, where Chesney played football.

Battle Ground Academy was where songwriter Casey Beathard's son, C. J. Beathard, was playing high school football at the time; the younger Beathard would eventually make it to the NFL as a backup quarterback for the San Francisco 49ers.

Track listing
CD single
 "The Boys of Fall" (Single Edit) – 4:21
 "Living in Fast Forward" (Live) – 3:55

Charts
On the Billboard Hot Country Songs charts dated July 31, 2010, the song debuted at number 17, becoming Chesney's highest debut on the charts since "Don't Blink" debuted at number 16 in September 2007.  The song peaked at number 18 on the Billboard Hot 100 pop singles chart in August as the 2010 high school football season commenced across the nation. The song became Chesney's eighteenth Number One single on the country charts for the week of October 9, 2010. With its peak, Chesney has charted at least one Number One song for each year since 2001.

Year-end charts

Certifications

References

2010 singles
2010 songs
Country ballads
2010s ballads
Kenny Chesney songs
Songs written by Casey Beathard
Music videos directed by Shaun Silva
Song recordings produced by Buddy Cannon
BNA Records singles
Songs written by Dave Turnbull
American football music